CIMA may refer to:

Acronyms
Canadian Independent Music Association, formerly the Canadian Independent Record Production Association
Cayman Islands Monetary Authority, Cayman Island's primary financial services regulator
Center for Intercultural and Multilingual Advocacy, a department in the College of Education at Kansas State University
Center for International Media Assistance, a media development organization in Washington, DC.
, an art museum in Kolkata, India
Centre International de la Mécanique d'Art (International centre for Art Mechanics), a museum in Switzerland
Channel Industries Mutual Aid, Channel Industries Mutual Aid, a Houston emergency response organization 
Chartered Institute of Management Accountants (formed 1919)
Chenille International Manufacturers Association
Costruzione Italiana Macchine Attrezzi (Italian Machine Tool Company), the gear and transmission manufacturing subsidiary of 
Cyprus Institute of Marketing (established 1978)
Microlight and Paramotor Commission, a Fédération Aéronautique Internationale commission

People
CIMA (wrestler) (born 1977), stage name of Japanese professional wrestler Nobuhiko Oshima

Other uses
 CIMA: The Enemy, console role-playing game
 CIMA (AM), a defunct radio station (1040 AM) located in Vancouver, British Columbia, Canada
 Hospital CIMA in San José, Costa Rica
 (R)-citramalate synthase, an enzyme